Onocephala is a genus of longhorn beetles of the subfamily Lamiinae, containing the following species:

 Onocephala aulica Lucas in Laporte, 1859
 Onocephala diophthalma (Perty, 1830)
 Onocephala lacordairei Dillon & Dillon, 1946
 Onocephala lineola Dillon & Dillon, 1946
 Onocephala obliquata Lacordaire, 1872
 Onocephala rugicollis Thomson, 1857
 Onocephala suturalis (Bates, 1887)
 Onocephala tepahi Dillon & Dillon, 1946
 Onocephala thomsoni Dillon & Dillon, 1946
 Onocephala vittipennis (Breuning, 1940)

References

Onciderini